is a Japanese politician of the Liberal Democratic Party, a member of the House of Representatives in the Diet (national legislature). A native of Asahikawa, Hokkaido and graduate of Kyoto University, he worked at Hokkaido Broadcasting, a local broadcast network in Hokkaido, from 1979 to 1996. He was elected to the House of Representatives for the first time in 1996 but lost his seat in 2000. In 2003, he ran unsuccessfully for mayor of Sapporo, Hokkaido but was re-elected to the House of Representatives in the same year.

References

External links 
 Official website 

1955 births
Living people
People from Asahikawa
Kyoto University alumni
Japanese television personalities
Members of the House of Representatives (Japan)
Liberal Democratic Party (Japan) politicians
21st-century Japanese politicians